Timoleon (Greek: Τιμολέων), son of Timodemus, of Corinth (c. 411–337 BC) was a Greek statesman and general.

As a brilliant general, a champion of Greece against Carthage, and a fighter against despotism, he is closely connected with the history of Sicily, especially Syracuse.

Early life
Timoleon was a member of the Corinthian oligarchy.  In the mid 360s BC, Timophanes, the brother of Timoleon, took possession of the acropolis of Corinth and effectively made himself tyrant of the city. In response, Timoleon, who had earlier heroically saved his brother's life in battle, and after repeatedly pleading with him to desist, became involved in the assassination of Timophanes. Most Corinthians approved his conduct as patriotic; however, the tragic occurrence, the actual fratricide, the curses of his mother, and the indignation of some of his fellow citizens, drove him into a self-imposed early withdrawal from politics and civic life for twenty years.

Sicily

Because of inner strife, the depredations and decline in Syracuse caused by the despots Dionysius and his son who succeeded him, and because of the repeated conflicts with powerful Carthage, a group of Syracusans sent an  appeal for help to Corinth, their mother city, which reached that city-state in 344 BC. 
Corinth agreed to help, but her chief citizens declined to accept the seemingly hopeless task of establishing a stable government in, tyrannical, fractious, insecure, and turbulent Syracuse.

Timoleon, being named by an unknown voice in the Corinthian popular assembly, was chosen by a unanimous vote to undertake the mission. He set sail for Sicily with seven ships, a few of the leading citizens of Corinth, and a small force of 700 Greek mercenaries. He eluded a Carthaginian squadron by an ingenious stratagem and landed at Tauromenium (now Taormina) in 344 BC, where he met with a friendly reception. At this time Hicetas, tyrant of Leontini, was master of Syracuse, with the exception of the island of Ortygia, which was occupied by Dionysius II, still nominally ruler.

Hicetas was defeated by Timoleon at Adranum, an inland town, and driven back to Syracuse. After his initial, unexpected success, Timoleon was sent reinforcements from Corinth and some north-western Greek states.  Following the siege of Syracuse, Dionysius II surrendered Ortygia in 343 BC on the condition of his being granted a safe conduct to Corinth, where he ended his life as a private, well-off, citizen.

Hicetas now received help from Carthage (60,000 men), but ill-success roused mutual suspicion; the Carthaginians abandoned Hicetas, who was besieged in Leontini, and who was then compelled to surrender. Timoleon was thus master of Syracuse.

He at once began the work of restoration, beginning with the symbolic act of destroying the citadel constructed and used by the tyrants to oppress the people of Syracuse, and replacing it with a court house.  He brought new settlers to depopulated Sicily from all over Greece, and re-established a popular government on the basis of the democratic laws of Diocles. The amphipolos, or priest of Olympian Zeus, who was chosen annually by lot out of three clans, was invested with the chief magistracy. The impress of Timoleon's reforms seems to have lasted to the days of Augustus.

Hicetas persuaded Carthage to send (340–339 BC) a great army (70,000 men), which landed at Lilybaeum (now Marsala). With a miscellaneous levy of about 12,000 men, most of them mercenaries, Timoleon marched westwards across the island to the neighbourhood of Selinus. Against all odds, after being deserted by a part of his army who believed that facing a foe six times as large as their own was hopeless, Timoleon, at the head of his infantry, won a great and decisive victory on the Crimissus. His victory was made possible by the fact that the Carthaginian army had not yet completed the river crossing so his small force only had to fight the elite part of the Carthaginian force.  He was also  aided by a violent storm at the backs of his troops but blinding to the Carthaginians.

Later, Carthage dispatched mercenaries to prolong the conflict between Timoleon and the Greek tyrants. But this ended in the defeat of Hicetas, who was taken prisoner and put to death. A treaty in 338 BC was agreed upon, by which Carthage was confined in Sicily to the west of the Halycus (Platani) and undertook to give no further help to Sicilian tyrants.  Most of the remaining tyrants were killed or expelled. This treaty gave the Greeks of Sicily many years of peace, restored prosperity, rule of law, and safety from Carthage.

Ruler of Syracuse 
Timoleon established a new Syracusan constitution.  It was described at the time as democratic.  However, for a short time he did have wide powers equivalent to a supreme commander.  He invited settlers from mainland Greece to assist in the re-population of Syracuse and other Sicilian cities.  During this period, Greek Sicily enjoyed a recovery in its economy and culture.

Retirement
Timoleon retired into private life shortly after the goals he set out to accomplish were met.  He remained however almost universally admired for his brilliant victories, moderation, and the restoration of democracy after half a century of tyranny, suffering, near economic collapse, turmoil, and depopulation.  However, even after his retirement, so great was the esteem of his countrymen, that when important issues were under discussion, the by-now blind Timoleon was carried to the  assembly to give his opinion, which was usually accepted. He was buried at the cost of the citizens of Syracuse, who erected a monument to his memory in their market-place, afterwards surrounded with porticoes, and a gymnasium called Timoleonteum.

Tyrant or democrat?
The ancient historian Timaeus gave Timoleon high accolades in his work.  However, Polybius, a historian with decided oligarchic sympathies, criticized Timaeus for bias in favour of Timoleon and many modern historians have sided with Polybius. Peter Green shares this scepticism but thinks it has gone too far. While he concedes that Timoleon tended to play the democrat while using the methods of a tyrant (albeit benevolently), he notes that Timoleon did make an effort to maintain the outward forms of democracy. Further, he reformed Syracuse in a democratic direction and demolished the stronghold of the island that had been so useful to tyrants in the past.

Timoleon's personal conduct throughout his life suggests a commitment to freedom and the rule of law.  For instance, when taken to court on spurious grounds, he refused to be exempted, saying that this was the "precise purpose for which he had so long laboured and combated—in order that every Syracusan citizen might be enabled to appeal to the laws and exercise freely his legal rights."

The historian George Grote wholeheartedly agrees with the following appraisal, given by a citizen of Syracuse at Timoleon's funeral, about three years after the Crimissus victory:The Syracusan people solemnise, at the cost of 200 minae, the funeral of this man . . .They have passed a vote to honour him for all future time. . .,—because, after having put down the despots, subdued the foreign enemy, and re-colonised the greatest among the ruined cities, he restored to the Sicilian Greeks their constitution and laws.

Notes

Sources

Primary sources
 Cornelius Nepos, Timoleon.
 Diodorus Siculus, Historical Library, xvi.65–90.

Secondary sources
 Plutarch, Life of Timoleon.

Further reading
 Westlake, H.D. Timoleon and His Relations With Tyrants. Manchester: Manchester University Press, 1952 (hardcover).
 Bicknell, P.J. "The Date of Timoleon's Crossing to Italy and the Comet of 361 B.C.", The Classical Quarterly, New Series, Vol. 34, No. 1. (1984), pp. 130–134.
 Talbert, R.J.A. Timoleon and the Revival of Greek Sicily, 344–317 B.C. (Cambridge Classical Studies). New York: Cambridge University Press, 1975 (hardcover); 2008 (paperback).

|width=25% align=center|Preceded by:Dionysius the Younger
|width=25% align=center|Tyrant of Syracuse345–337 BC
|width=25% align=center|Succeeded by:oligarchy position next held by Agathocles in 320 BC
|-

410s BC births
337 BC deaths
4th-century BC Greek people
Ancient Corinthians
Ancient Greek generals
Sicilian tyrants
People of the Sicilian Wars